

Films

1982 in LGBT history
1982